The cuneiform Ri sign, or Re, is found in both the 14th-century BC Amarna letters and the Epic of Gilgamesh; it is in the top 25 most used cuneiform signs (Buccellati, 1979) for ri, or re, but has other syllabic or alphabetic uses, as well as the Sumerogram usage for RI (Epic of Gilgamesh).

The ri (cuneiform) sign has the following uses in the Epic of Gilgamesh:

dal
re
ri
tal
ṭal
RI (Sumerogram usage)

The specific usage numbers for the sign's meaning in the Epic is as follows: dal-(4), re-(56), ri-(372), tal-(70), ṭal-(2), RI-(1).

In the Amarna letters, ri also has a special usage when coupled with the naming of the Pharaoh, as "LUGAL-Ri". Lugal is the Sumerogram translated in the Akkadian language to 'King', Sarru. Thus in the Amarna letters, Lugal is used as a stand-alone, but sometimes supplemented with Ri, and specifically used as Sumerogram SÀR (an equivalent Sumerogram to mean LUGAL) to be combined with RI to make sarru for king. ('The King', as an appellation is sometimes created by adding ma (cuneiform), suffix to the end of a name (Lugal-ma.)

References

Moran, William L. 1987, 1992. The Amarna Letters. Johns Hopkins University Press, 1987, 1992. 393 pages.(softcover)
 Parpola, 1971. The Standard Babylonian Epic of Gilgamesh, Parpola, Simo, Neo-Assyrian Text Corpus Project, c 1997, Tablet I thru Tablet XII, Index of Names, Sign List, and Glossary-(pp. 119–145), 165 pages.
Ugarit Forschungen (Neukirchen-Vluyn). UF-11 (1979) honors Claude Schaeffer, with about 100 articles in 900 pages. pp 95, ff, "Comparative Graphemic Analysis of Old Babylonian and Western Akkadian", author Giorgio Buccellati, ( i.e. Ugarit and Amarna (letters), three others, Mari, OB,Royal, OB,non-Royal letters).

Cuneiform signs